Dewan Bahadur V. Thirumalai Pillai  was an Indian politician and from vanniyar  community who served as the President of the Madras Corporation from 1923 to 1924. He was a member of the Justice Party. Pillai also served as trustee of Pachaiyappa Charities and a member of the committee of management of Chengalvaraya Naicker's Technical Institute, one of the pioneer institutions in the city of Madras of promoting technical education. He along with Sir P.Theagaraya Chetti took great plans to reorganize the institute according to modern requirement.

References 

V. Thirumalai Pillai was Dewan Bahadur and not Rao Bahadur
 

Mayors of Chennai
Justice Party (India) politicians
Year of birth missing
Year of death missing